This article serves as an index – as complete as possible – of all the honorific orders or similar decorations awarded by Bulgaria, classified by Monarchies chapter and Republics chapter, and, under each chapter, recipients' countries and the detailed list of recipients.

Awards

Monarchies 
European monarchies

Norwegian Royal Family 
See also decorations pages (mark °) : Harald, Sonja, Haakon, Mette-Marit, Mârtha Louise, Astrid & Ragnhild

 Harald V of Norway: Cordon of the Order of Stara Planina ° 
 Queen Sonja of Norway: Cordon of the Order of Stara Planina ° 
 Haakon, Crown Prince of Norway: Cordon of the Order of Stara Planina ° 
 Mette-Marit, Crown Princess of Norway: Cordon of the Order of Stara Planina°

Swedish Royal Family   

They have been awarded :

 Carl XVI Gustaf of Sweden : Grand Cross of the Order of Stara Planina 
 Queen Silvia of Sweden : Grand Cross of the Order of Stara Planina
 Victoria, Crown Princess of Sweden : Grand Cross of the Order of Stara Planina

Danish Royal Family 

 Margrethe II of Denmark : Grand Cross with Cordon of the Order of the Stara Planina (Bulgaria 1971) 
 Frederik, Crown Prince of Denmark : 1st Class with swords of the Order of Stara Planina (2006)  
 Mary, Crown Princess of Denmark : 1st Class of the Order of Stara Planina (2006) 
 Prince Joachim of Denmark : 1st Class with swords of the Order of Stara Planina (2006)

Dutch Royal Family 

 Princess Beatrix of the Netherlands : Grand Cross with Cordon of the Order of the Stara Planina (1999)

Belgian Royal Family 
King and Queen's state visit in Republic of Bulgaria (14/10/2003 - 16/10/2003)

 King Albert II : Grand Cross of the Order of Stara Planina (2003)
 Queen Paola : Grand Cross of the Order of Stara Planina (2003)

Monegasque Princely Family 

 Albert II, Prince of Monaco : 1st Class decoration of the Order of Stara Planina (before 07/2011)

References 

 
Bulgaria